The 2022 Algarve Cup was the 28th edition of the Algarve Cup, an invitational women's football tournament held annually in Portugal. It took place from 16 to 23 February 2022.

Teams
Five teams were participating.

Note: Australia withdrew before the draw due to serious concerns for the health and wellbeing of players and team officials following a lengthy and crowded 2021 schedule.

Squads

Format
Five teams played two matches each to determine the standings. The top two teams played the final, while the other three teams played each other in 45 minutes matches to determine the final ranking.

Preliminary round

Standings

Results
All times are local (UTC±0)

As the withdrawal of Denmark after their second match left four teams in the competition, the remaining five group matches were scratched:  Sweden and Italy qualified for the final, while Portugal and Norway qualified for the third place match.

Third place match
Originally, it was planned that the teams finishing third to fifth would play each other in a round-robin of 45-minute matches. 

However, following the withdrawal of Denmark, this was scratched and a full-length third place match was played.

Final

Final ranking

Goalscorers

References

External links
Official website

Algarve Cup
Algarve Cup
Algarve Cup
Algarve Cup
2022 Algarve Cup